Dzieżgów  is a village in the administrative district of Gmina Myślibórz, within Myślibórz County, West Pomeranian Voivodeship, in north-western Poland. 

References

Villages in Myślibórz County